NA-141 (Kasur-IV) was a constituency for the National Assembly of Pakistan.

Area
The constituency consisted of the  areas in the Chunian Tehsil and Pattoki Tehsil which, according to the 2018 delimitations, have now been moved to NA-139 (Kasur-III) and NA-140 (Kasur-IV) respectively.

Election 2002 

General elections were held on 10 Oct 2002. Sardar Muhammad Asif Nakai of PML-Q won by 57,063 votes.

Election 2008 

General elections were held on 18 Feb 2008. Rana Muhammad Ishaq Khan of PML-N won by 58,807 votes.

Election 2013 

General elections were held on 11 May 2013. Rana Muhammad Ishaq Khan of PML-N won by 96,737 votes and became the  member of National Assembly.

References

External links 
 Election result's official website

NA-141
Abolished National Assembly Constituencies of Pakistan